G.M. Momin Women's College is the college in Bhiwandi in Thane district in Maharashtra state in India. The college was established in 1989 and has arts, science and commerce facilities.

References

Education in Bhiwandi
Women's universities and colleges in Maharashtra